Woothampatti Punnaivana Ayya Soundarapandian (15 September 1893 – 22 February 1953) was a leading figure in Nadar Mahajana Sangam and became the first Nadar member of the Madras Legislative Council upon a recommendation by P.T. Rajan in 1920. Nadar's family had previously supported and worked for the electoral victory of P.T.Rajan. He is known for his effort to associate the Nadar community with the Self-Respect Movement founded by Periyar E. V. Ramasamy. He was known as the uncrowned king of the Nadar community.

Background 

Nadar came from a prominent coffee planter family that owned estates near Kodaikanal. He was the principal leader of the Nadars from the 1920s to 1930's.

Career 

Nadar served as a member of the Madras Legislative Council from 1920 to 1937. He represented the interests of the Nadar community in the Justice Party as well as the council. He also served as the President of the Ramnad District board from 1928 to 1930 and Madura District Board from 1943 to 1947.

Social activism 

Invoking the ideologies of Periyar, he urged Nadars to advocate Self-Respect marriages and inter-caste dining. He was selected by Periyar as the president of the first self-respect conference held in 1929. It is also rumoured that he had provided financial support for the Anti-Hindi agitation of 1937-40. Acknowledging the agitation's popular support, Lord Erskine, the then Governor of Madras wrote to Viceroy Linlithgow in July 1938 that "Compulsory Hindi has been the cause of great trouble in this province and is certainly contrary to the wishes of the bulk of the population..."

Social Reform 

Nadar also worked for the upliftment of Dalits, Tiyyas and for other social causes. He succeeded in putting an end to the Kamudi punitive tax.

Later life 

The Justice Party government of the Raja of Bobbili (1932–36) was infamous throughout the province for its corruption and misgovernance . Hence, by the mid-1930s, despite Soundarapandian's personal charisma, the influence of the Justice Party began to wane. Moreover, the social reform measures such as the Temple Entry Authorization and Indemnity Act of 1939 introduced by the Indian National Congress government of C. Rajagopalachari and the rise of the Indian National Congress leader K. Kamaraj within the ranks of the Nadar community triggered Soundarapandian Nadar's political decline. By the time, Kamaraj became the President of the Tamil Nadu Congress Committee in the early 1940s, most of the Nadar community leaders had shifted their allegiance to the Indian National Congress and supported the Indian Independence Movement.

Commemoration 

Pondy Bazaar, Chennai's principal shopping district is believed to have been named after Soundarapandian Nadar. A statue of the leader has been erected at the entrance of the bazaar and recently, a signboard was set up with the bazaar's name mentioned as "Soundarapandian Angadi". The bronze statue was sculpted by Nagappa Jagannathan and unvailed by Government of Kalaignar Karunanidhi in presence of Thiru Sivandi Adathinar.He was also active in setting up schools etc. for the Nadar community in his home town, kayamozhi. He is also referred to as 'The Uncrowned King of the Nadar Community' in many books and papers related to the Self Respect Movement. He was also instrumental in setting up the coffee co operative curing works in Pattiveeranpatti. His descendants continue to live in Pattiveeranpatti.

Notes

References 

 
 

Dravidian movement
Tamil activists
Tamil Nadu politicians
Anti-Brahminism
1893 births
1953 deaths
People from Dindigul district